Suday Yadav is an Indian politician from Bihar and a Member of the Bihar Legislative Assembly. He won the Jehanabad constituency after death of his father Mudrika Singh Yadav in 2018 and was also elected to 2020 assembly.

References

Bihar MLAs 2020–2025
Bihar MLAs 2015–2020
Rashtriya Janata Dal politicians
Living people
Year of birth missing (living people)